Twenty-nine full expansions for the MMORPG EverQuest have been released. Expansions are purchased separately from the original game and they provide additional content. For example: raising the maximum character level, adding new races, classes, zones, continents, quests, equipment, and additional game features. Additionally, the game is updated through downloaded patches.

Expansions were traditionally shipped in boxes to stores, but have also been able to be downloaded through a digital service. The retail versions often come packaged with a bonus feature such as a creature that the player can put in their in-game house.

Expansion packs

The Ruins of Kunark

The first expansion pack for EverQuest was EverQuest: The Ruins of Kunark, released on April 24, 2000. It introduced a new land area to the game, the continent of Kunark, which had been previously unexplored. Through a mix of in-game events and fiction published on the web by Verant Interactive, the storyline of the discovery of Kunark was established.

In the United States, The Ruins of Kunark sold 92,172 units between February 2001 through the first week of November alone. Desslock of GameSpot reported that the game and The Scars of Velious "sold well early in the year, but sales evaporated during the course of the summer, especially after the release of Camelot."

The Scars of Velious

EverQuest: The Scars of Velious was released on December 5, 2000. The expansion focuses on high-level content (levels 35 and up), providing many extremely powerful monsters to fight and a number of zones meant to be used by large groups of players.

The expansion takes place on the continent of Velious, an icy continent towards the south of Norrath. The title refers to three chasms in Velious that are said to be the place where the great dragon Veeshan struck the continent with her claws. One of these claw marks is believed to be in a zone known as The Great Divide, an area where the Coldain have established their home in the mountain side. The expansion introduced both Frost giants and Coldain dwarves to the EverQuest universe, as well as a new sect of dragons known as the Claws of Veeshan. Players could ally their characters with any of the three factions, and fight against the others to gain rewards exclusive to their chosen faction.

The expansion is also notable for introducing the Sleeper's Tomb zone, a locked zone that players could unlock with a key from a quest, and vanquish the four dragons that guarded The Sleeper, a very powerful beast that should never be unleashed. The first players completing this zone led to the first world changing event, where The Sleeper would awaken and rampage his way through Norrath. Scars of Velious also reintroduced Ethereal Planes such as the Plane of Growth, home of Tunare (goddess of nature) and the Plane of Mischief. Those planes, just like the original Planes (Hate, Fear and Sky) required players to have reached the level of 46 in order to enter. Plane of Growth also reintroduced the notion of Planar armor, providing a full set for most classes except druids, paladins, and rangers who went into a new second floor of the Plane of Hate.

In the United States, The Scars of Velious sold 66,496 units from February 2001 through the first week of November.

The Scars of Velious holds a 85% rating on GameRankings.

The Shadows of Luclin

The third expansion pack, EverQuest: The Shadows of Luclin, was released on December 4, 2001, a year after the second. The expansion focuses on high-level content; it provides a number of zones meant to be used by large groups of players and a number of extremely powerful monsters to fight.

The expansion takes place on a moon of Norrath called Luclin and introduces the Vah Shir, a playable catlike race, and the Beastlord character class. Notable NPC races that were added to the EverQuest universe are the Shissar, a snake-like race, and the Akhevans. The Shadows of Luclin also incorporates a new game engine, new character models and gives players the ability to design graphic user interfaces. The appearance of the player's character was completely redesigned, giving them more layers and rounder shapes. Mounts were also introduced with this expansion – they allow players to regenerate their Health and Mana without generating as much aggro (hatred from monsters). Alternate Advancement started with the Luclin expansion which allows players to further grow and customize their classes.

The game includes many zones in which players of all levels can experience, several raid encounters such as the Lord Inquisitor Seru, and a high-end raiding zone, Vex Thal. SoL also introduced some new events that made some encounters more challenging than before, especially in the Ssraeshza Temple zone.

The Shissars (serpent-like creatures) were extremely powerful beings who once roamed the continent of Kunark where they had enslaved the Iksars. Rile, an Iksar hero, started a revolution and called upon a mystical force referred to as the Greenmist, who then killed the Shissars. Fleeing Norrath because the atmosphere became toxic, the surviving Shissars were helped by the Combine Empire and were sent to Luclin and the underwater sanctuary introduced years later with "The Buried Sea".

On Luclin, the Shissars built the temple of Ssraeshza - home of the powerful Emperor Ssraeshza (powerful enough to slay gods according to game lore). To protect themselves from the Greenmist, the Shissars magically sealed the Grey, a place where no atmosphere exists, and built their temple. Ssraeshza Temple (also known as Ssra) is part of the access to the high-end zone of Vex Thal. Defeating the Emperor required completion of a key "quest" inside the zone, requiring the player(s) to track down, kill, and collect many other items, as well as collecting special weapons which did special damage to the emperor; The Emperor is immune to regular weapons, making the special weapons necessary for his death. Such weapons were introduced with SoL and are referred to as Bane Weapons. Later on, a Shadow Knight only quested weapon was introduced in Cabilis and called the Greenmist (Sacred Khukri of Rile), the most powerful Shissar-bane weapon.

In the United States, The Shadows of Luclin sold 360,000 copies ($9.9 million) by August 2006, after its release in December 2001. It was the country's 46th best-selling computer game between January 2000 and August 2006. Combined sales of all EverQuest computer games released between January 2000 and August 2006 had reached 2.7 million units in the United States by the latter date.

The Shadows of Luclin holds a 86% rating on GameRankings.

The Planes of Power

The fourth expansion, EverQuest: The Planes of Power, was released on October 29, 2002. The expansion comprises an assortment of otherworldly planes that do not exist in a planetary sense within the EverQuest universe.

The expansion added content to the game aimed specifically toward the high-end player. In addition to adding new zones to the game, the expansion also introduced a network of portal points through the game realm. Players could use them to quickly travel to and from various regions through a central plane, known as Plane of Knowledge.

The primary goal, or end-quest, of The Planes of Power is access to the Plane of Time. Access to this plane can only be obtained through vanquishing the four elemental deities or avatars of such: Fennin Ro, The Rathe Council, Coirnav and Xegony. To gain access to all of the zones of the expansion and successfully enter the Plane of Time, the players needed to complete 28 flag events of all sorts, involving the death of planar deities and deific creatures. These encounters can only be completed with the organized effort of up to 72 players working together simultaneously.

In order to enter the expansion's basic zones, a player had to reach the former set planar level of 46. From there, one had to complete tasks to gain access to the more advanced zones. It was later changed so that once the character reached level 55, they gained access to two more zones which are the Plane of Valor and the Plane of Storms. At 62 the Bastion of Thunder then became available. Those level limits can be bypassed by completing the progression of the expansion, allowing for example to be level 46 while adventuring in the Bastion of Thunder. The maximum level was increased from 60 to 65 with this expansion and new Particle Weapons were added, when before only epic weapons had such visual effects.

The Planes of Power holds a 83% rating on GameRankings.

The Planes of Power was a nominee for PC Gamer USs "2002 Best Expansion Pack" award, which ultimately went to Tom Clancy's Ghost Recon: Island Thunder and Desert Siege (tie).

The Legacy of Ykesha

EverQuest: The Legacy of Ykesha was released 5 months after the fourth expansion, the shortest gap yet at the time. Promoted by Sony Online as EverQuests "first download-only extension", it was the first EverQuest content expansion available almost exclusively from Sony Online's direct purchase and download service. Due to overwhelming demand, a limited number of CDs were made available to retailers after the product release date. Ykesha was released in February 2003 and was considered a minor content addition at the time. Over time, Ykesha's "extension" designation was lost, and the product is now referred to as a full-fledged EverQuest expansion.

The Legacy of Ykesha introduced the froglok (the frog-like humanoid race present since the original EverQuest was released) as a playable race. To do this, Sony Online Entertainment introduced a storyline whereby the frogloks invaded the Troll city of Grobb and reclaimed and renamed it Gukta. The trolls were sent fleeing to the city of Neriak. Another part of the storyline introduced the Broken Skull Clan of the trolls, which had a rivalry with the Grobb trolls, and live on the island of Broken Skull Rock just off the south coast of Antonica. This is where the new zones of the expansion are located.

Other enhancements of the expansion included dyeable armor, an increase in the number of bank slots available for characters, a new guild management system, a new armor slot called 'Charms', and a new overhead mapping system which allowed players to customize maps. The zones were intended for mid-level adventurers between levels 36-60 and were generally received as very uninspired and added little to the lore of Norrath, however the guild management, extra bank slots, trading between characters utility and mapping tools are considered vital, and dyeing of armor is very popular.

Computer Gaming World's Jeff Green gave the expansion a rating of 2½ out of 5 and said "I love EverQuest as much as the next dork, but even I wish Sony would ease up on the expansions a bit. When the most noteworthy feature of your new expansion is the ability to role-play a frog, maybe that's a sign you're running out of ideas."

Lost Dungeons of Norrath

EverQuest: Lost Dungeons of Norrath was the sixth expansion, released on September 9, 2003. It was made available as a digital download in September 2003. However, purchasers of the retail box version were rewarded with an in-game item (a magic bag), starting Sony's trend to include in-game items as incentive to purchase retail copies of their expansions.

Lost Dungeons of Norrath introduced broad-based instanced dungeons to Norrath, revolving around tales of the Wayfarers—an NPC adventuring organization. Players complete adventures for the Wayfarers in one of five different dungeon themes. Each dungeon theme has about ten different variations of the zone, and players can also choose the type and difficulty of their adventure. When the adventure is finished successfully, players are awarded Adventure Points which can be spent on items, spells, and 'augments' at the Wayfarer camps.

Augments were introduced in Lost Dungeons of Norrath and allow players to enhance existing items by adding an augment to them. Existing items in the game had generally only a single augment slot, so only one augment could be added. Items purchased at the Wayfarer camps occasionally had up to three slots available to augment. In addition to group adventuring, the Wayfarer camps also offered raid content, in which multiple groups could challenge difficult high-end content.

Lost Dungeons of Norrath holds a 82% rating on GameRankings.

Gates of Discord

EverQuest: Gates of Discord was released as the seventh expansion on February 10, 2004. The expansion focused on high-level content, providing a number of zones meant to be used by large groups of players and many extremely powerful monsters to fight. The introduction of this expansion in early 2004 was beset by numerous serious quality issues. John Smedley, President of Sony Online Entertainment (SOE) has described the release of this expansion as "SOE's worst mistake in five years".

The GoD expansion takes place on the continent of Taelosia and expands upon the storyline introduced in Lost Dungeons of Norrath. In GoD, the Wayfarers Brotherhood discovers a new continent across the seas from Odus, and the known areas of Norrath. The wayfarers set up a base in the new lands of Taelosia, and provide the transportation system that allows players to teleport to the new continent quickly. As players explore the storyline, they find that the former inhabitants of Taelosia have practically disappeared, and evil creatures are roaming abroad. Players are challenged by the Wayfarer Brotherhood to find out who or what is behind this new evil that now inhabits Taelosia.

The expansion features 20 new NPC models, and 18 new zones. There are 10 single-group instanced trials, 8 uninstanced exp zones, and 9 raid zones/instances. All of the zones in GoD are designed for higher level (50+) characters, and many of the raid zones require level 65 before they can zone in.

In GoD, the Berserker character class is also introduced. Berserkers are a melee class that use 2-handed weapons along with special class abilities to double attack and intimidate their opponents, as well as going into attack frenzies. Also included was an updated tradeskill interface with numerous new recipes. Tradeskill combine containers have been upgraded to include recipe lists (which can be searched, by resulting item name or tradeskill difficulty range). The new interface also allow players to combine items without opening up inventory bags to find the components. This allows players to easily make several tradeskill combines in a short amount of time. The new tradeskill containers are available to all players, but items for the new recipes can only be found in GoD zones.

GoD introduced the tribute system, an alternate money sink the developers created to take cash out of the game system. Scattered throughout the home cities of all character races are Tribute Masters who act as vendors. Players can donate items or coin to the Tribute Masters and earn "tribute points". Tribute points can then be used to increase stats, increase resists, increase HP / mana pools or regen, or gain spell-like focus effects (water breathing, increased damage foci, improved healing foci, etc.). The abilities gained through Tribute Points are all on a timer; once activated points get deducted at a certain rate depending on what tribute effects were selected. A later expansion introduced guild Tribute points, which stack with personal Tribute Points.

Leadership Alternate Abilities (LAA) are also a new feature introduced in GoD. Similar to normal AA, Leadership AA is an Opt-In system. Once opted in, 20% of the group leaders XP will go to Leadership abilities that will enhance play when they are the leader of a group or raid. Leadership abilities include neat features like increased mana, increased hit points, increased HP regen, increased ATK, special targeting circles to help the group target the correct mob, marking a path to lost players, etc. In February 2014 a change was made removing the need to earn Leadership Alternate Abilities and instead automatically granting them.

Gates of Discord holds a 76% rating on GameRankings.

Omens of War

EverQuest: Omens of War was released as the eighth expansion on September 14, 2004, continuing the September–February release data cycle. The expansion focused on high-level content and introduced new folklore to the EverQuest universe.

This expansion:

 Added five more levels, increasing the cap to 70
 Introduced new Epic weapons, known as Epic 2.0
 A new Tribute system, allowing guilds to pool tribute points to purchase various effects
 A "task system", intended to "allow players to have quick solo content while waiting for a group to form".
 An expansion of the character Title system, allowing players to choose which available title their character could have, as well as adding a great many more, including tradeskill titles like Expert Chef
 A ninth spell slot, which could be earned via AA purchase
 A voice macro system, intended to allow players to make audible comments to each other.

The expansion's final zone, Citadel of Anguish, gained particular notoriety among players who raided in the game as a result of the Overlord Mata Muram encounter. Widely considered the most difficult raid boss relative to its time in any MMO, the encounter had a unique mechanic which would target a random member of the entire raid and require a specific action take place within a few seconds of the emote or else the raid would be completely wiped out. While the mechanic is now commonplace today, during its time the boss was widely considered "impossible," to beat until Cestus Dei on the Veeshan server conquered it on March 23, 2005.

Omens of War holds a 84% rating on GameRankings.

Dragons of Norrath

The ninth expansion, EverQuest: Dragons of Norrath, was released on February 15, 2005. It includes mostly missions given out by an NPC that are completed by a group of players, in instanced zones. It includes a revamp of the Lavastorm zone where the missions are acquired, and an uninstanced zone called The Broodlands where the instanced zones can be accessed. The content revolves around dragons and related monsters. When completing the missions, players receive crystals that can be exchanged at merchants for items.

This expansion also innovates on previous ones. For example, the instanced zones are also available in uninstanced versions, allowing people to explore them and gain experience by simply killing monsters without going into missions. It also has 4 major raid targets, and some smaller scale raids, including Vishimtar, a very powerful dragon.

The content in Dragons of Norrath is suitable for characters of level 45 and up.

Dragons of Norrath holds a 81% rating on GameRankings.

Depths of Darkhollow

The tenth expansion, EverQuest: Depths of Darkhollow, was released on September 13, 2005. It features monster missions, spirit shrouds, evolving items, new missions, new creatures, new zones, new items and more. While certain aspects of this expansion can be enjoyed by characters of all levels, the new zones and missions are intended primarily for characters of level 45 and higher.

Monster missions: These will allow players to take missions, but playing as a high end monster instead of a player character. For example, a player might assume the role of 'Lord Nagafen' and repel a raid of NPCs who have come to slay the dragon lord for his rare treasures.
Spirit shrouds: These will allow anyone to take the form of a monster of lower or equal level, to hunt with their lower level friends in any zone. For example, a player with a level 70 character could take on the form of a level 15 spider to hunt with their friends of the same level.
Evolving items: New types of items will be introduced in which, while equipped, will gain their own experience points and increase in level for better stats and function.

Depths of Darkhollow holds a 73% rating on GameRankings.

Prophecy of Ro

EverQuest: Prophecy of Ro was released on February 21, 2006, and introduced new content, zones, monsters, revamps, and features. The action occurs in several new zones, including the Plane of Rage, home of Sullon Zek, the Plane of Magic, home of Druzzil, and the lost city of Takish-Hiz. The zones for the city of Freeport and the Desert of Ro were also revamped. According to the press release, new features included:

 Player-set Traps
 Spheres of Influence
 Interaction with game world Objects
 Buff Filters
 Additional Bank Spaces
 7 new Zones, and 6 new Instances

This expansion is intended for characters of level 50 and higher.

PC Gamer's Mark Crump gave the expansion a rating of 65% and said "As a status-quo expansion, PoR's not bad, but the twice-a year-pace of adding zones that are swiftly obsolete isn't helping the game out. I'd rather SOE do something with current, lesser-used areas instead of creating tomorrow's forgotten ones."

The Serpent's Spine

EverQuest: The Serpent's Spine was released as the twelfth expansion on September 19, 2006. New features include new zones, a new player race known as the "Drakkin", an attainable player level of 75, as well as new spells and alternate advancements.

The expansion was added with the aims of making soloing (playing EverQuest alone rather than as part of a larger group) a more viable option. This was done through the addition of a new town, home of the newly added Drakkin race, which provides various tasks for all levels of game play to gain experience, gear, and money. The advertisements for “The Serpent’s Spine” stated that one could go from level one to level 75 without a group or exploring any of the previously existing locations in the game simply through completion of these newly added tasks.

The Serpent's Spine expansion also added the rest feature, allowing players who have been out of combat for a short period of time to regenerate mana and health at a drastically increased rate. This effect was added to aid those soloing, as well as to solve complaints about down time or time spent meditating to regenerate lost mana. While generally well received by the EverQuest community, there have been complaints about the new rest effect causing class balancing issues. This is because some classes can expend their mana rapidly to cause large amounts of damage only to regenerate it with the new rest effect in the time it takes for their group to kill a single monster, thus increasing the total damage done in a group compared to the previous method of conserving mana to ensure a steady supply. This means that classes that are unable to use this method are relatively weaker.

The Buried Sea

EverQuest: The Buried Sea is the 13th expansion pack released for EverQuest, on February 13, 2007. It features over 60 new raids and group missions and allows characters to raid pirate vessels. The content is intended for characters of level 55 and higher.

Players may design and display a guild emblem and upgrade the banner to gain special abilities for guild members, including the ability to plant it on a battlefield where guild members can teleport directly to it. Fellowships allow a common chat channel, the ability to create a campfire that can help in adventures, and a token that will allow quick travel to other fellowship members.

Players may gain access to a new inventory slot that can be fitted with a customizable Energeian power source and armor that can tap into the power source.

Secrets of Faydwer

EverQuest: Secrets of Faydwer is the 14th expansion, released on November 13, 2007, ending the September–February release cycle of previous expansions. In a letter by the current EverQuest producer, Clint Worley, it was announced that the production cycle of the game was going to be altered to allow for one expansion release every year. Previously, two expansions had been produced annually.

Within the fictional storyline of the game, the evil gnomish necromancer, Meldrath the Malignant, takes his Fortress Mechanotus to the skies on a mission of destruction exposing a network of mineshafts and tunnels that lead across the Steamfont Mountains to the unexplored lands of Faydwer.

Announced encounters include steamwork machines and the prismatic dragon, Kerafyrm.

Features:

Heroic Items: will allow abilities beyond their maximum potential.
Level cap increase to level 80.
New Zones, Non Player Characters, and Interactive Objects.
New Alternate Advancement Abilities, Spells, and Items.

Seeds of Destruction

EverQuest: Seeds of Destruction, the 15th expansion, was released on October 21, 2008. Within the fictional storyline of the game, Zebuxoruk, an insane fallen god, is the only person who can aid players in preventing the destruction of Norrath by stopping the evil forces of Discord and repairing the damage done to The Void.

Features:

Mercenaries: Players can now hire player-controlled mercenaries to quest with.
Level cap increase to level 85.
New high level item sets, new Alternate Advancement ability lines, new spells, and new skill caps.
Over 20 new zones including Oceangreen, Bloody Kithicor, Field of Bone, Invasion of Earth, Kuua, and Discord.

Underfoot

EverQuest: Underfoot was released on December 15, 2009, as the sixteenth expansion pack. Within the fictional storyline of the game, the afterlife world of Brell's Rest, where worthy worshipers of the god Brell go after leaving Norrath, erupts with conflict between the gnolls and the kobolds.

Features:

Underfoot itself
Expansion Progression Window: Players can now see how far they have gone through the expansion's progression and what is left to accomplish.
Achievement System: Players can now track and display their overall progress through the world of Norrath.
Focus Target Window: This separate window will allow players to add specific targets for easier party/raid monitoring and management.
New quests, spells, armor, and more new weapon models than any previous expansion.
13 new zones with brand new quests, raids, etc.
All Inclusive: The download-only expansion also contains all 15 previous expansions as well.

House of Thule

The seventeenth expansion pack, EverQuest: House of Thule, was released on October 12, 2010.

 Maximum level increased to 90.
 Over 800 AAs.
 "Treasured items" player housing addition.
 New purchasable housing items.
 Player housing trophy system.
 18 new raids, 13 new zones, 450 new spells, 17 new missions, & 120 new quests.
 Player inventory size increased.

Veil of Alaris

EverQuest: Veil of Alaris was released on November 15, 2011, as the eighteenth EverQuest expansion pack. The plot involves the demise of the Thule family.

 Maximum level increased to 95.
 New alternate advancements
 Features a brand new continent, Alaris, hidden behind a veil of mist
 12 new zones as well as new content such as quests, loot, monsters and raids
 New guild halls located in guild neighborhoods
 Revamp of the hotbars; 12 buttons per bar 
 Ability to link items and clickies directly to hotbar including from inside bags! 
 Email items 
 Customizable guild ranks

Rain of Fear

The nineteenth expansion pack, EverQuest: Rain of Fear, was released on November 28, 2012. The plot continues the storyline of the House of Thule and Veil of Alaris expansions.

Level cap increase from 95 to 100 – Achieve a new max level of 100 and set a new standard of gameplay.
Slayer System – Gain special rewards and titles for defeating large numbers of foes.
Aggro Meter – A new tool to help better manage aggro, displaying it relative to the player's group.
Collection System – Discover items throughout Norrath and collect sets for exciting rewards and titles.
Improved Brokering System – Sell items in the Bazaar while being offline! More flexibility as a buyer to search and purchase from anywhere in the world. 10 Expedited Delivery Vouchers are included with the Standard Edition and 20 are included with the Collector's Edition.
New Linear Item Progression – Stats on armor collected will increase while advancing from one tier to another.
Customization with non-visible armor – All non-visible armor in Rain of Fear can be worn by all characters, enabling customized stats for every encounter.
Class-specific stat distribution – Collect items that are designed specifically for each class's abilities.
More than 1800 new spells (ranks 1, 2 & 3) – Spell arsenals are increased exponentially.
More than 550 AAs – Which increase power and abilities.
More than 3500 new items – Aids customization
More than 3000 New Tradeskill recipes – Craftsmanship to create unique items.
More than 110 Quests – A broader gameworld for challenges and loot.
13 Raids – Collect valuable rewards from all new adventures.
9 Zones – Be the first to discover untouched lands of Norrath.
19 Missions – Experience intriguing lore and immersive Missions.
Legends of Norrath – 5 Digital Booster Packs.

Call of the Forsaken

EverQuest: Call of the Forsaken was released on October 8, 2013, as the 20th expansion pack. The plot follows cataclysmic events in the region of West Karana which have torn an invisible seam to expose the Ethernere and bind countless realities, forcing players to defeat Lady Lendiniara to restore peace.

 Mercenary Alternate Advancements (AAs) — A specialized line of AAs that will enable players to customize the skills of mercenaries and make them even more powerful.
 Mercenary Gear — The ability for player to manage Mercenary equipment and provide them with powerful weapons and armor.
 "Heroic Adventures" — Mission style content that allow for unique experiences with each playthrough, including a chance at new loot, rares, and currency to collect and spend at special merchants.
 Shared Bank Slots (2)
 Additional Spells, Alternate Advancements (AAs) and Gear
 New Raids
 New Tradeskill Recipes
 Several New Zones Including West Karana, Neriak 4th Gate, Bixie Warfront and the Deadhills.

The Darkened Sea

EverQuest: The Darkened Sea, the 21st expansion pack, was released on October 28, 2014. The plot revolves around Firiona Vie's attempt to heal Emperor Katta, which is interrupted when Lanys T`Vyl and a splinter faction from The Combine attempt to kidnap the Emperor. Players must band together to aid in tracking down Lanys and rescuing the Emperor.

 Level cap increased to 105.
 Eight new zones, including Thuliasaur Island and Combine Dredge.
 Mount Key Ring - Easier access to all obtained mounts from a single interface.
 New missions and quests, including six new Heroic Adventures and seven new raids.
 New tradeskills, spells, AAs, and items.

The Broken Mirror

EverQuest: The Broken Mirror, the 22nd expansion pack, was released on November 18, 2015. The plot revolves around Anashti Sul's newly discovered desire for power as her being is fractured into two aspects: life and decay. Players must band together to stop her plot to plague Norrath with war to disrupt the balance of life in order to gain power for herself.

 Instanced versions of "Plane of Hate" and "Plane of Fear" that scale for level 75-105 raids.
 4 completely new zones and 3 revamped zones.
 A new "Illusion Key Ring" that enables players to access all illusions from a single location.
 New quests, heroic adventures, missions, and additional raids.
 New spells and AAs.

Empires of Kunark

Empires of Kunark is the 23rd EverQuest expansion and was released on November 16, 2016. After decades of slumber, Imperator Tsaph Katta awakens and vows to reform the Combine Empire – the progenitors of much of the human race – by any means necessary.
 7 Expansion zones.
 Familiar Key Ring.
 New Quests, Missions, and 8 Additional Raids.
 24 new Collections.

Ring of Scale

Ring of Scale is the 24th EverQuest expansion and was released on December 12, 2017. Return to Kunark and aid the Combine as they face off against the Sarnak Empire and the Ring of Scale. What will become of the Sarnak Empire? Will dragons reign supreme over Norrath? Only the most powerful of heroes will be able to help the Combine to breach the heart of Veeshan's Peak. 
 Adventure to Level 110
 6 Expansion zones.
 New Raids, Quests and Missions.
 New Spells, Combat Abilities, and AAs.
 New Collections.

The Burning Lands

The Burning Lands is the 25th EverQuest expansion and was released on December 11, 2018. It was first announced on October 1, 2018, and its featured content includes six new adventure zones based around the otherworldly Planes of Air and Fire, new raids, and a new "luck" statistic that influences the frequency of critical hits, the amount of gold in a player's split after defeating enemies in a group, and the success rate of crafting attempts.

 Luck Stat – A new stat that influences luck. It can randomly increase the share of gold, critical damage inflicted, and the chance of success at a trade-skill combine.
 6 Expansion Zones – New fantastic environments and architecture of the Planes of Fire, Air, and Smoke. 
 New Raids, Quests, and Missions
 New Spells, Combat Abilities, and AAs
 New Collections

Torment of Velious

Torment of Velious is the 26th expansion pack for EverQuest released in December 2019. Daybreak Games teased the title in an August 2019 news post on the game's official website, with a release set for later that year. The expansion's story involves players returning to the frozen continent of Velious first seen in the Scars of Velious expansion released in 2000, and features six new zones, new raid content, a raised level cap from 110 to 115, and a new graphical ice shader.

 Level Increase to 115 – new level cap
 6 Expansion Zones – Uncover the mysteries in new zones on the continent of Velious. A new threat faces all and many creatures that have been familiar to Norrathians have been strangely transformed by living ice.
 New Raids, Quests, and Missions
 New Spells, Combat Abilities, and AAs
 New Collections

Claws of VeeshanEverQuest: Claws of Veeshan is the twenty-seventh expansion pack to EverQuest. It was announced on October 14, 2020, in a producer's letter on the game's official website. A continuation of the story from the previous expansion, Torment of Velious, the plot involves the player challenging the dragons and undead creatures who roam the frozen lands of Velious. It features six new zones along with new quests, raids, missions, and alternate advancement abilities for each class, as well as a new Dragon's Hoard offering additional storage space. Claws of Veeshan was proceeded by a beta test period which took place in October 2020, with a final release on December 8, 2020.

Terror of LuclinEverQuest: Terror of Luclin is the twenty-eighth expansion pack to EverQuest. It was announced on the game's official website on October 12, 2021. The story revolves around the return to the moon of Luclin, the setting of the third expansion, EverQuest: The Shadows of Luclin from 2001. A powerful force known as the Akheva led by High Priestess Aten Ha Ra emerge in an attempt to re-stablish their empire across the entirety of Luclin while the vampire lord Mayong Mistmoore also serves as a primary antagonist. Players join with a resistance of Akhevian rebels to oppose Aten's plans for domination. The expansion features 7 new zones as well as an increased level cap of 120, as well as new abilities, spells, and alternate advancements.

Night of ShadowsEverQuest: Night of Shadows is the twenty-ninth expansion pack to EverQuest. It was announced on the game's official website by producer Jenn Chan in October 2022 with a release set for the following December.

Expansion 30EverQuest: ''' is the thirtieth expansion pack to EverQuest. It was announced on the game's official website by producer Jenn Chan in January 2023 with an official title reveal in October 2023 and a release set for the following December 2023.

Bundles
Between 2001 and 2007, Sony Online Entertainment released retail bundles that included the original EverQuest and a collection of expansion packs. The first compilations were the European EverQuest Deluxe Edition and North American EverQuest Trilogy, which included the base game, The Ruins of Kunark, and The Scars of Velious. Subsequent packages would be released almost yearly until the Anniversary Edition'' in April 2007, which included the base game and the first 13 expansions.

Notes

References

EverQuest
MacOS games
Video game expansion packs
Video games developed in the United States
Windows games